SourceFed was a YouTube channel and news website created by Philip DeFranco in January 2012 as part of YouTube's original channel initiative, and was originally produced by James Haffner. 

The main SourceFed channel mainly focused on popular culture, news, and technology. SourceFed was a part of DeFranco's portfolio of Internet-based media properties, including his own eponymous news YouTube series. That portfolio was named DeFranco Creative and later renamed SourceFed Studios when acquired by Discovery Communications' Revision3. 

On March 20, 2017, the cancellation of SourceFed, along with its still-active sister channels, was announced. The closure of the SourceFed Studios network was decided by the newly formed Group Nine Media, led by Discovery Communications, which was formed as a merger between SourceFed Studios and four other networks in October 2016. The final SourceFed video was a farewell livestream broadcast on March 24, 2017. Around the time of the closure of SourceFed Studios, the SourceFed channel had accumulated over 1.7 million subscriptions and 900 million video views.

History

Under DeFranco's ownership (2011–2013)

Development and launch

SourceFed was an idea Philip DeFranco had been considering as an evolution of his own YouTube series, The Philip DeFranco Show (PDS). In an interview with Forbes, DeFranco stated that he originally wanted to turn his daily show into several daily segments. He added that there was confusion among his audience when this format was tested, convincing DeFranco that he would need to create a new series to not alienate, but grow his audience.

The SourceFed YouTube channel was created in April 2011. In late 2011, YouTube began its $100 million funding of original or premium content channels. Due to DeFranco's position as a YouTube partner, the website offered him funding for an original channel. The SourceFed channel, based on a blog of the same name, was one of these channels. DeFranco revealed that he acquired the funding to launch the channel by originally promising YouTube that the channel would be run as a "celebrity gossip channel", and that it would consist of a single show rather than multiple different shows. However, DeFranco negotiated for less funding, in return to have creative control over the channel's content. The funding was provided by YouTube, as the channel was part of YouTube's original content initiative. DeFranco hand-picked the first six hosts of SourceFed: Joe Bereta, Elliott Morgan, Lee Newton, Steve Zaragoza, Trisha Hershberger, and Meg Turney. Additionally, SourceFed was originally produced by James Haffner.

The channel launched as an original channel on January 23, 2012. In 2012, Reuters reported that DeFranco had plans to create a news network. Along with the staple news show (20 Minutes or Less), five additional shows began airing within the first month of the channel's January 2012 launch: Curb Cash, One On One, DeFranco Inc.: Behind the Scenes, Comment Commentary and Bloopers. Curb Cash ended in March 2012. The New Movie Thing Show, a movie review series, and a movie club-style series titled The SourceFed Movie Club were launched in May 2012. Since then, SourceFed has debuted new additions to the channel's lineup. As additional content was being introduced, the SourceFed crew expanded, adding hosts and editors to its team.

Launch year events
In early 2012, the Maxim Hot 100 voting website crashed on multiple occasions. Bereta and Morgan claimed that these crashes coincided with them telling their audience through 20 Minutes or Less to vote for Newton as a write-in candidate. Maxim did not address their claims, but did come out with an article noting that Newton had "list potential". In May, it was announced that Lee Newton placed 57th on the 2012 Maxim Hot 100 list.

In March 2012, Philip DeFranco announced that he would take the SourceFed crew to VidCon 2012. The four hosts (Morgan, Newton, Bereta, and Zaragoza) of 20 Minutes or Less, along with DeFranco, had a Q&A panel and performed at VidCon 2012.

SourceFed hosts Meg Turney and Elliott Morgan, along with Philip DeFranco, presented a series of videos as part of YouTube's "Election Hub" during the 2012 Democratic National Convention and the 2012 Republican National Convention, and joined journalists during live coverage streamed at the end of each night of the conventions. A public relations representative for YouTube stated “Having awesome partners like Philip DeFranco involved will attract younger viewers and he will have a really fresh take on politics". YouTube's "Election Hub" channels for major news networks only received several hundred views, whilst DeFranco's videos on Election Hub received tens of thousands. It was put down to it being in an 'experimental stage'. Most of the partners of Election Hub, excluding DeFranco, Al Jazeera English and BuzzFeed, struggled to garner 1,000 views of their on-demand content during the RNC. During the videos, Turney predicted that the DNC will not make a difference for young voters. During the conventions, SourceFed uploaded videos explaining them. #PDSLive 2012 Election Night Coverage, a five-hour live event hosted by SourceFed and DeFranco, was nominated for a Streamy Award for Best Live Event.

Philip DeFranco later created a spinoff channel, SourceFedNerd (stylized as SourceFedNERD), which was announced on May 16, 2013.

Under Discovery and Revision3 (2013–16)
In June 2013, Philip DeFranco sold SourceFed along with the other channels under his DeFranco Creative portfolio to Revision3. DeFranco also became an executive of Revision3 and the Senior Vice President of Philip DeFranco Networks and Merchandise as a result of the move. In June 2016, DeFranco made his earliest public clarification that he has "no hands on the creative decisions [made] on [SourceFed]," and while discussing the cancellation of SourceFed in 2017, DeFranco detailed that after selling his DeFranco Creative umbrella to Revision3, he began to have less involvement on the channel, before having no involvement at all. 

During 2013, SourceFed was announced to be a sponsor of that year's VidCon, as well as special guests of the event. The event would be held in August. During the event, the couch featured on Comment Commentary was "eaten" by Sharkzilla, the mascot of Shark Week. DeFranco previously hosted Discovery Channel's Shark Week event. While at VidCon 2013, DeFranco gathered 554 people to play Ninja, a playground game, claiming the amount would be a world record. SourceFed also made appearances at VidCon in 2014, 2015 and 2016.

In April 2014, it was announced that Elliott Morgan and Meg Turney would both be leaving SourceFed by the end of the month. They were the first hosts to ever leave SourceFed, something which would occur frequently after their precedent. Morgan and Turney, like the hosts which would leave after them, appeared in other online media promptly after their departures; Morgan would work with Mashable, while Turney would become part of Rooster Teeth's personnel.

In September 2014, Zaragoza and Newton hosted a news story covering various charities' refusal of donations from Reddit, following the then-recent celebrity nude photo leaks. The video received criticism from the SourceFed fanbase, and according to StatSheep, the channel lost over 20,000 subscribers. DeFranco took to Reddit, stating that the significant drop in subscribers was either due to "an error of that individual stats website or YouTube removing dead accounts." Additionally, in response to requests or demands in favor of removing or firing any hosts, DeFranco stated, "No. I let SourceFed control their own creative." The video has slightly more dislikes than likes.

On February 27, 2015, SourceFed hosted a live event from  YouTube Space LA. The show contained live versions of the weekly recurring shows and spoof bits done by the hosts.

2016 Google−Hillary Clinton video
In June 2016, SourceFed uploaded a video titled Did Google Manipulate Search for Hillary?, discussing whether or not Google manipulated search results to display Hillary Clinton in an untruthful positive light. This video was uploaded at the tailend of the primaries for the 2016 United States presidential election. Matt Lieberman, the host for the video, suggested that Google's autofill feature pulls up results for Clinton's crime reform, despite "hillary clinton crime" being a more popular search term than "Hillary Clinton crime reform".

The video attracted considerably more media attention than other SourceFed uploads, and drew responses from Google, Donald Trump (the Republican Party's then-presumptive nominee for President of United States), and DeFranco. Trump stated that if SourceFed's claims were true, "it is a disgrace that Google would do that." Google defended its search engine; one representative of the company stated "Google Autocomplete does not favor any candidate or cause. Claims to the contrary simply misunderstand how Autocomplete works."

Group Nine Media merger and cancellation (2016–17)
On March 20, 2017, the four hosts of SourceFed's primary channel at the time—Ava Gordy, Mike Falzone, Candace Carrizales, and Steven Suptic—released a video addressing the cancellation of SourceFed as well as its SourceFedNerd and People Be Like spinoffs. They also announced the schedule for the channel's final week; a podcast, a Comment Commentary episode, a usual white wall-styled video, and a live-streamed farewell video were announced for Tuesday, Wednesday, Thursday, and Friday, respectively. At the time, the SourceFed channel had amassed just over 1.7 million subscribers and 906 million video views in its run. The cancellation of the channel happened shortly after newly formed media company Group Nine Media acquired SourceFed Studios's parent company Revision3 (renamed as Seeker) from Discovery Digital Networks. Seeker and SourceFed Studios were merged along with Thrillist, NowThis News, and The Dodo into Group Nine, which then decided to close the SourceFed Studios network. DeFranco clarified on Twitter that he had no involvement with the decision to dissolve SourceFed Studios.

The final Nerd and People Be Like videos were released on March 24, 2017. SourceFed's final video was also uploaded, which doubled as the intro for the channel's 6 hour final live stream.

Hosting

When the channel launched in 2012, YouTube content creator Joe Bereta of Barats and Bereta, actor Elliott Morgan, and comedian Lee Newton, were introduced as the original three hosts of SourceFed. DeFranco, who hand-selected the three, also appeared as a host for the channel's first two weeks. DeFranco also hand-selected a second batch of three hosts (Trisha Hershberger, Meg Turney, and Steve Zaragoza) who debuted on the channel in 2012. All but Zaragoza would eventually leave the channel throughout 2014 and 2015. However, these hosts later made guest appearances on the channel after their departures, and Morgan specifically was briefly brought back on the main channel to host The Study.

Ross Everett was introduced as the seventh on-camera host, after spending time as a writer for the series. In April 2014, DeFranco announced Everett was moved back to his writing position. However, near the end of the month, Everett announced his departure from SourceFed in a Tumblr blog post. Amidst the 2014 departures of Everett, Morgan, and Turney, SourceFed brought on William Haynes, Matt Lieberman, and Reina Scully in March 2014, serving as the de facto replacements for the former. While Haynes and Lieberman stayed on with SourceFed through its cancellation, Scully left the company in August 2016.

With Bereta, Hershberger, and Newton's departures in late 2014 and early 2015, new hosts were brought on. On February 24, 2015, Sam Bashor accepted an offer to become an official host on the SourceFed and SourceFedNerd channels. He was previously a writer for the channels and made several appearances in videos. He was also the host for DeFranco's merchandising branch, ForHumanPeoples. Early 2015 would also see YouTube personality Bree Essrig, as well as Australian TV & radio host Maude Garrett join in hosting SourceFed.

Early 2016 saw Mike Falzone join the main channel as the host of a revised form of #TableTalk, which was brought back to SourceFed's main channel content output.  Scully and Garrett both announced their departures from SourceFed in August. Coinciding with their departures, Ava Gordy and Candace Carrizales were introduced as hosts on the main SourceFed channel.

Hosts
Joe Bereta (2012-2014)
Elliott Morgan (2012-2016)
Lee Newton (2012-2015)
Steve Zaragoza (2012-2017)
Trisha Hershberger (2012-2015)
Meg Turney (2012-2014)
Ross Everett (2013-2014)
William Haynes (2014-2017)
Matt Lieberman (2014-2017)
Reina Scully (2014-2016)
Sam Bashor (2015-2017)
Steven Suptic (2015-2017)
Bree Essrig (2015-2017)
Maude Garrett (2015-2016)
Mike Falzone (2016-2017)
Ava Gordy (2016-2017)
Candace Carrizales (2016-2017)
Whitney Moore (2016-2017)
Filup Molina (2016-2017)

Host timeline

Guest hosts

 Keith Jordan (February 14, 2012)
 Harley Morenstein (March 5, 2012 and April 4, 2013)
 George Watsky (May 1, 2012, SF Nerd; April 7, 2014 and August 12, 2014)
 The Gregory Brothers (Michael, Andrew, Evan and Sarah Gregory) (June 26, 2012)
 Sean Klitzner (October 10, 2012)
 Timothy Ferriss (November 19, 2012)
 Grace Helbig (June 10, 2013; 2 episodes)
 Laci Green (July 25, 2013)
 Rhett and Link (Rhett McLaughlin and Link Neal) (September 5, 2013)
 Megan Batoon (March 10 and July 29, 2015)

Content

SourceFed News
The main series on the SourceFed channel was SourceFed News. The series featured 1–2 hosts presenting news stories, and covering a variety of topics. Episodes of the series were presented in a comedic daily newscast format. During his tenure on the series, Bereta was its head writer.

Early in its run, SourceFed's news series was titled 20 Minutes or Less, as five news stories would be covered daily throughout separate videos totaling 20 minutes or less. Due to only presenting five stories a day, stories covered on SourceFed often "cross-pollinated", or were influenced by news stories on the PDS. SourceFed News stories were also referred to as "white wall" videos. George Watsky's music was commonly used throughout the series in the background.

Notable additional programming
In addition to daily news coverage, the SourceFed channel produced and uploaded several shows.

Reception

Audience and viewership

From May to December 2012, Deadline Hollywood tracked the weekly views of all the original premium channels on YouTube. The channel was consistently one of the top original channels every week. On May 26, 2012, the SourceFed YouTube channel reached the 100 million video view milestone. On August 1, 2012, SourceFed became the first of the YouTube original channels to reach 500,000 subscribers. In celebration of the event, 20 Minutes or Less uploaded a special video onto SourceFed that featured clips of SourceFed's audience congratulating them and stating the reason that they subscribed to the channel. 

SourceFed was one of the most popular YouTube original channels, as the channel earned over 20 million monthly views. Due to its success, SourceFed was among the 30-40% of original channels to be renewed by YouTube in November 2012. On July 14, 2013, the SourceFed channel reached one million subscribers.

Critical reception
The Wall Street Journal noted that it was hard to figure out why the simplicity of the idea behind SourceFed was able to receive mass appeal.

After winning the Streamy Audience Choice Award for Series of the Year, SourceFed's The New Movie Thing Show was criticized by The Atlantic. The publication wrote "The audience pick for series of the year went to SourceFed, which consists of short clips of people explaining things in loud, fast voices," and "It's not even close to quality programming. Just something goofy to watch online."

Awards and nominations
SourceFed was nominated for four awards at the 3rd Streamy Awards, winning in the Audience Choice for Series of the Year category. The following year, SourceFed won the award for News and Current Events Series.

See also
The Valleyfolk

Notes
Notes

References
References

Primary video and playlist sources
In the text these references are preceded by a double dagger (‡):

Further reading

 
2012 establishments in California
2012 web series debuts
2017 web series endings
American non-fiction web series
English-language YouTube channels
Entertainment-related YouTube channels
Internet properties disestablished in 2017
Internet properties established in 2012
Mass media about Internet culture
Mass media companies disestablished in 2017
Mass media companies established in 2012
Shorty Award winners
Streamy Award-winning channels, series or shows
YouTube-funded channels
YouTube channels closed in 2017
YouTube channels launched in 2012